Turn Me Out may refer to:
 Turn Me Out (Praxis song)
 Turn Me Out (EP), a remix EP by Logan Lynn